Events from the year 1929 in Canada.

Incumbents

Crown 
 Monarch – George V

Federal government 
 Governor General – Freeman Freeman-Thomas, 1st Marquess of Willingdon 
 Prime Minister – William Lyon Mackenzie King
 Chief Justice – Francis Alexander Anglin (Ontario)
 Parliament – 16th

Provincial governments

Lieutenant governors 
Lieutenant Governor of Alberta – William Egbert 
Lieutenant Governor of British Columbia – Robert Randolph Bruce 
Lieutenant Governor of Manitoba – Theodore Arthur Burrows (until January 18) then James Duncan McGregor (from January 28)
Lieutenant Governor of New Brunswick – Hugh Havelock McLean  
Lieutenant Governor of Nova Scotia – James Cranswick Tory  
Lieutenant Governor of Ontario – William Donald Ross 
Lieutenant Governor of Prince Edward Island – Frank Richard Heartz 
Lieutenant Governor of Quebec – Lomer Gouin (until March 28) then Henry George Carroll (from April 2)
Lieutenant Governor of Saskatchewan – Henry William Newlands

Premiers 
Premier of Alberta – John Edward Brownlee      
Premier of British Columbia – Simon Fraser Tolmie
Premier of Manitoba – John Bracken 
Premier of New Brunswick – John Baxter 
Premier of Nova Scotia – Edgar Nelson Rhodes 
Premier of Ontario – George Howard Ferguson  
Premier of Prince Edward Island – Albert Charles Saunders  
Premier of Quebec – Louis-Alexandre Taschereau 
Premier of Saskatchewan – James Garfield Gardiner (until September 9) then James Thomas Milton Anderson

Territorial governments

Commissioners 
 Gold Commissioner of Yukon – George Ian MacLean 
 Commissioner of Northwest Territories – William Wallace Cory

Events
January 10 – Lomer Gouin becomes Quebec's 15th Lieutenant Governor, serving until his death on March 28, 1929.
March 22 – The Canadian schooner and rum-runner I'm Alone is sunk by the US Coast Guard's .
April 4 – Henry George Carroll becomes Quebec's 16th Lieutenant Governor.
June 6 – 1929 Saskatchewan election: James Garfield Gardiner's Liberals win a plurality, but the other parties, led by James T.M. Anderson's Conservatives, will form a coalition against Gardiner, forcing him to resign as premier
May 29 – A series of explosions rip through Ottawa's sewer system.
September 9 – James Anderson becomes premier of Saskatchewan, replacing James Gardiner
September 10 – The Hudson Bay Railway opens for traffic to Churchill, Manitoba
October 18 – The Judicial Committee of the Privy Council rules in the Persons Case that women are eligible to be senators.
October 29 – The crash of the New York Stock Exchange marks the beginning of the Great Depression
October 30 – Ontario election: Howard Ferguson's Conservatives win a third consecutive majority
November 13 – A second stock market crash hits Canada.

Arts and literature
January 6 – Regina's Darke Hall auditorium opened.

Science and technology
Wop May and Vic Horner brave poor visibility and −30 °C temperatures in an open cockpit to rush diphtheria anti-toxin to Fort Vermilion.
Frozen fish fillets are introduced by the Biological Board of Canada developed by Archibald Huntsman.

Sport
March 30The Ontario Hockey Association's Toronto Marlboros win their first Memorial Cup by defeating the Manitoba Junior Hockey League's Elmwood Millionaires 2 games to 0. The deciding Game 2 was played at Mutual Street Arena in Toronto
September 12The first legal forward pass in Canadian football is completed.
November 30The Hamilton Tigers win their fourth Grey Cup, defeating the Regina Roughriders 14 to 3 in the 17th Grey Cup played at A.A.A. Grounds in Hamilton

Births

January to March

January 17 – Jacques Plante, ice hockey player (d. 1986)
January 20 – Pat Mahoney, businessman, politician, and judge, MP for Calgary South (1968–1972), General Manager of the Calgary Stampeders (1965) (d. 2012)
January 21 – Bill Norrie, politician and educator, Mayor of Winnipeg (1979–1992), Chancellor of the University of Manitoba (2001–2009), respiratory failure. (d. 2012)
January 23 – John Charles Polanyi, chemist and 1986 Nobel Prize in Chemistry joint laureate
February 12 – Philip Kives, businessman
February 28 – Frank Gehry, architect
March 20 – William Andrew MacKay, academic, President of Dalhousie University (19801986) (d. 2013)

April to June

April 8 – Garnet Bloomfield, politician (d. 2018)
April 11 – Eric Luoma, cross-country skier (d. 2018)
May 8 – Claude Castonguay, banker and politician (d. 2020)
May 10 
Antonine Maillet, novelist, playwright and scholar
Peter C. Newman, journalist
May 12 – Dollard St. Laurent, Canadian ice hockey player (d. 2015)
May 13 – Al Adair, politician, radio broadcaster and author (d. 1996)
May 14 – Gump Worsley, ice hockey player (d. 2007)
May 16 – Claude Morin, politician
May 18 – Walter Pitman, educator and politician
June 7 
John Turner, lawyer, politician and 17th Prime Minister of Canada
Walter Weir, politician and 15th Premier of Manitoba (d. 1985)
June 8 – Louise Maheux-Forcier, author
June 9 
Jean Rougeau, professional wrestler and bodyguard of Quebec Premier René Lévesque (d. 1983)
Harold R. Steele, businessman (d. 2022)
June 10 – Pearl McGonigal, politician
June 20 – Edgar Bronfman, Sr., businessman
June 27 – H. Ian Macdonald, economist

July to September
July 2 – Anna-Marie Globenski, pianist and teacher (d. 2008)
July 3 – Béatrice Picard, actress
July 10 – Moe Norman, golfer (d. 2004)
July 18 – Roy Killin, footballer
July 19 – Ronald Melzack, psychologist (d. 2019)
July 26 – Marc Lalonde, politician and Minister
July 30 – Bill Davis, politician and 18th Premier of Ontario
August 1 – Sidney Green, politician
August 3 – Peter Salmon, swimmer (d. 2003)
August 9 – George Scott Wallace, British Columbia physician and politician (d. 2011)
August 19 – Leonard Evans, politician
August 27 – George Scott, professional wrestler and promoter (d. 2014)
September 14 – Dimitri Dimakopoulos, architect
September 19 – Gertrude Story, writer and broadcaster (d. 2014)
September 24 -Edward M. Lawson, trade unionist, politician and Senator

October to December
October 7 – Graeme Ferguson, filmmaker and inventor who co-invented IMAX (d. 2021)
November 1 – Charles Juravinski, businessman and philanthropist (d. 2022)
November 2 – Richard E. Taylor, physicist, 1990 Nobel Prize in Physics joint laureate (d. 2018)
November 21 – Laurier LaPierre, broadcaster, journalist, author and senator (d. 2012)
November 24 – Harry Oliver Bradley, politician
December 6 – Harry Langford, footballer  (d. 2022)
December 13 – Christopher Plummer, actor (d. 2021)
December 15 – Emery Barnes, Canadian football player and politician (d. 1998)
December 23 – Patrick Watson, broadcaster, author, commentator and television writer, producer and director (d. 2022)
December 28 – Terry Sawchuk, ice hockey player (d. 1970)

Full date unknown
Ken Adachi, writer and literary critic (d. 1989)

Deaths

January to March
January 6 – George Henry Murray, politician and Premier of Nova Scotia (b. 1861)
January 14 – Alexander Warburton, politician, jurist, author and Premier of Prince Edward Island (b. 1852)
January 18 – Theodore Arthur Burrows, politician and Lieutenant-Governor of Manitoba (b. 1857)

January 19 – Edward Charles Bowers, politician (b. 1845)
January 29 – John Howatt Bell, lawyer, politician and Premier of Prince Edward Island (b. 1846)
February – Richard Gardiner Willis, politician (b. 1865)
February 17 – James Colebrooke Patterson, politician, Minister and Lieutenant-Governor of Manitoba (b. 1839)
March 1 – James Albert Manning Aikins, politician and Lieutenant-Governor of Manitoba (b. 1851)
March 28 – Lomer Gouin, politician and 13th Premier of Quebec (d. 1861)
March 29 – Hugh John Macdonald, politician, Minister and 8th Premier of Manitoba (b. 1850)

April to December
April 17 – Clifford Sifton, politician and Minister (b. 1861)
May 6 – William Dillon Otter, soldier and first Canadian-born Chief of the General Staff (b. 1843)
June 3 – John Morison Gibson, politician and Lieutenant Governor of Ontario (b. 1842)
June 8 – Bliss Carman, poet (b. 1861)
June 23 – William Stevens Fielding, journalist, politician and Premier of Nova Scotia (b. 1848)
July 30 – Antonin Nantel, priest, teacher, school administrator, and author (b. 1839)
October 10 – Elijah McCoy, inventor and engineer (b. 1843)

See also
 List of Canadian films

Historical documents
British Privy Council members decide "that women are eligible to be summoned to and become members of the Senate of Canada"

"Crest of the flood of selling" passes on New York Stock Exchange

Charlotte Whitton warns family allowance would reduce mothers to economic slavery and government parental role would undermine family

Residential school principal objects to farm training because land limited, students are not labourers, and hired hands would not obey her

Calgary Board of Trade report on Turner Valley oil field

At Walkerville, Ont. General Motors plant, it is "very dangerous" to work exposed pulleys late in 12-hour night shift

Killing of Americans by U.S. border guards enforcing prohibition regulations draws outrage

Lord Beaverbrook on overcoming "the great general division between farmers and industrialists" to establish imperial free trade

Hunter-conservationist Jack Miner calls for extermination of wolves in Ontario

Mackenzie King "wholly convinced in the reality of the spiritual world" after medium contacts his dead family members

References

 
Years of the 20th century in Canada
Canada
1929 in North America